The Terrell Terrors were a Minor League Baseball team based in Terrell, Texas. The team played as members of the Class D level Central Texas League in 1915 and 1916, first playing as the Terrell Cubs in 1915. The Terrell Terrors become members of the Texas Association in 1925 and 1926.

MLB alumni
Mack Allison (1925)
Ed Appleton (1925)
Virgil Cheeves (1926)
Roy Johnson (1916)
Otto McIvor (1925)
Larry Pratt (1916)
Leo Tankersley (1926)
Johnny Vergez (1926)

Sources

Defunct baseball teams in Texas
Defunct minor league baseball teams
Central Texas League teams
Baseball teams established in 1916
Baseball teams disestablished in 1926
Kaufman County, Texas
1916 establishments in Texas
1926 disestablishments in Texas